Kuty is a town in Ukraine.

Kuty may also refer to:
Kúty, a village in Slovakia
Kuty, Warmian-Masurian Voivodeship, a village in Poland
KUTY, a radio station